The following is a list of the film and television appearances of American actress Marlee Matlin.  Matlin, who had previously acted in stage productions, made her screen debut as the female lead in the 1986 film Children of a Lesser God, for which she won a Golden Globe Award for Best Actress in a Motion Picture – Drama and the Academy Award for Best Actress in a Leading Role, becoming the youngest Best Actress winner and the first deaf performer to have won an Academy Award. Matlin, who is deaf, generally plays deaf characters. However, in 1994 Matlin also played a hearing woman when she appeared in the title role of the television movie Against Her Will: The Carrie Buck Story, based on the true story of Carrie Buck, who was not deaf. Matlin was nominated for a CableACE Award for her performance as Carrie Buck.

Although Matlin has continued to make occasional film appearances, most of her work has been in television. From 1991 to 1993, she starred in the police drama series Reasonable Doubts as Assistant District Attorney Tess Kaufman, receiving two Golden Globe nominations. She has had recurring roles as Mayor Laurie Bey in Picket Fences (for which she received an Emmy Award nomination), pollster Joey Lucas in The West Wing (appearing on all seven seasons of its run), attorney Ruby Whitlow in My Name Is Earl, gay sculptor Jodi Lerner in The L Word, and guidance counselor Melody Bledsoe in Switched at Birth. Her numerous guest appearances have included Seinfeld, The Practice, and Law & Order: Special Victims Unit, each of which brought her another Emmy nomination.

Matlin has also competed on the game shows Dancing with the Stars and The Celebrity Apprentice. On the April 3, 2011 episode of The Celebrity Apprentice, Matlin raised $986,000 for her charity, the Starkey Hearing Foundation, setting a record for the most funds raised for charity in a single event on any television show. The show's production company then donated an additional $14,000 to bring the contribution to one million dollars.

Filmography

Film

Television

Theater

See also
 List of awards and nominations received by Marlee Matlin
 List of Academy Award records
 List of oldest and youngest Academy Award winners and nominees – Youngest winners for Best Actress in a Leading Role
List of oldest and youngest Academy Award winners and nominees – Youngest nominees for Best Actress in a Leading Role
 List of Jewish Academy Award winners and nominees
List of actors with Academy Award nominations

References

External links

 MarleeMatlin.net > About Marlee > Film/Television at the Official website
 
 
 

Actress filmographies
American filmographies